Farzaneh Sharafbafi (born in 1973) is an Iranian manager and academic who was the Chairwoman and was the CEO of Iran Air.

She has taught at Amirkabir University of Technology and Shahid Sattari Aeronautical University.

References 

Living people
1973 births
Academic staff of Amirkabir University of Technology
Iranian aerospace engineers
Iranian women engineers
Academic staff of Shahid Sattari Aeronautical University
21st-century women engineers
Iranian women in business
Iranian businesspeople